The 1945 election for Mayor of Los Angeles took place on April 3, 1945. Incumbent Fletcher Bowron was re-elected outright with minimal opposition. The candidates challenging Bowron included restaurateur Clifford Clinton, city councilmember Ira J. McDonald, and former State Assemblymember Sam Yorty.

Municipal elections in California, including Mayor of Los Angeles, are officially nonpartisan; candidates' party affiliations do not appear on the ballot.

Results

References and footnotes

External links
 Office of the City Clerk, City of Los Angeles

1945
Los Angeles
1945 California elections
1945 in Los Angeles